Bhaiswar is a village in Sonebhadra, Uttar Pradesh, India.

References

Villages in Sonbhadra district